Al-Anwar Club  is a Saudi Arabian football team in Hotat Bani Tamim City playing at the Saudi Second Division.

Al-Anwar Club Stadium
Al-Anwar Club Stadium, is a multi-use stadium in Hotat Bani Tamim, Saudi Arabia. It is currently used mostly for football matches, on club level by Al-Anwar. The stadium has a capacity of 8,000

Current squad 
As of Saudi Second Division:

References

 goalzz

Anwar
1973 establishments in Saudi Arabia
Association football clubs established in 1973
Football clubs in Hotat Bani Tamim